The Hungarian wax pepper is a medium variety of Capsicum annuum with a wide Scoville Scale range of 1,000 to 15,000 Scoville units.

Description
This pepper is usually harvested before maturity when still yellow. It measures between 4"-6" inches in length (10–15 cm) which tapers to a rounded point. Upon maturity, the pepper becomes orange, then red. Although similar in appearance to banana peppers when immature, it is a different cultivar.

Due to the ease of cultivation and the productivity of the plant, many home gardeners pickle these whole or sliced in rings.

Varieties 

 Szentesi paprika is a mild one, has PGI status. Named after the town Szentes.
 TV paprika; TV stands for "tölteni való", meaning to-be-stuffed. A top value mild variant eaten raw, used for various dishes, or, as its name suggests, can be used for stuffed paprika, filled with meatball and served with tomato sauce, the taste being similar to lecsó.
 Lecsó paprika; a cheaper, overripe, mild variant, often with a shade of orange color. As its name suggests, often used for various lecsó-based dishes.
 Bogyiszlói paprika is a hot Hungarian wax pepper. It looks very similar to TV paprika, around 10,000 on Scoville Scale. Named after the village Bogyiszló, where it is traditionally harvested.

Gallery

See also
Paprika

References

Hydroponics
Chili peppers
Capsicum cultivars